Alexander Milne may refer to:

 Alexander Milne (entrepreneur) (1742–1838), Scottish-American entrepreneur
 Alexander Milne (civil servant) (died 1850), British civil servant
 Sir Alexander Milne, 1st Baronet (1806–1896), Royal Navy admiral
 Alexander Taylor Milne (1906–1994), English historian
 Alec Milne (Alexander Soutar Milne, born 1937), Scottish former professional footballer for Cardiff City
 Alec Milne (footballer, born 1889) (Alexander James Milne, 1889–1970), footballer for Doncaster Rovers and Stoke
 Alex Milne (artist), Canadian comic book artist
 Alan Alexander (A. A.) Milne (1882–1956), English writer